Professor Richard Roscow Morris "Dick" Gendall (12 April 1924 – 12 September 2017) was a British expert on the Cornish language. He was the founder of "Modern Cornish"/Curnoack Nowedga, which split off during the 1980s. Whereas Ken George mainly went to Medieval Cornish as the inspiration for his revival, Gendall went to the last surviving records of Cornish, such as John and Nicholas Boson, in the eighteenth-century. He taught at the University of Exeter.

He was also a folk musician, and made several recordings with Brenda Wootton (e.g. Crowdy Crawn), as well as a poet and writer in Cornish itself under the bardic name of "Gelvinak".

Gendall founded Teere ha Tavaz, an organisation which seeks to promote the Cornish language in its Modern Cornish or Curnoack Nowedga variety. It is also a small publisher on, and in, the Cornish language.

He died in Liskeard, Cornwall in September 2017 at the age of 93. He belonged to a Penzance family which moved to St Blazey when he was very young and later to St Winnow. After wartime service in the Royal Navy he studied linguistics and music at the University of Leeds; then he was able to acquire some knowledge of the Cornish language from R. Morton Nance and A. S. D. Smith but was disappointed that it was no longer spoken. He started a campaign for the revival of Cornish as a spoken language.

For many years he taught French and Spanish at Helston Grammar School.

Bibliography
 Kernewek Bew (Living Cornish). 1972
 The Pronunciation of Cornish. Teere ha Tavaz, Mahunyes, 1991.
 A Students' Grammar of Modern Cornish. Cussel an Tavas Kernuack, Mahunyes, 1991.
 1000 Years of Cornish (Second edition). Teere ha Tavaz, Mahunyes, 1994
 Dictionary of Modern Cornish. Teere ha Tavaz, Mahunyes, 1992–1997.
 Tavaz a Ragadazow – The Language of my Forefathers. Teere ha Tavaz, Mahunyes. 2000.
 Practical Modern Cornish. Teer ha Tavaz, Mahunyes. 2003.
 The Language of our Cornish Forefathers. Cornish Language Partnership. 2009.

See also

 Agan Tavas
 Ken George
 Henry Jenner
 Robert Morton Nance
 Dolly Pentreath
 Nicholas Williams

References

1924 births
2017 deaths
Celtic studies scholars
Cornish folk musicians
Cornish folk singers
Writers from Cornwall
Cornish language activists
Cornish-language writers
Cornish-speaking people